The soft-furred rat (Millardia meltada), or soft-furred metad, is a species of rodent in the family Muridae native to South Asia.

Description
Head and body length is 13–16 cm. Tail ss 12–14 cm. Yellowish to brownish gray dorsally and whitish in the underparts. Tail naked, blackish above, paler beneath. Fine dense fur shorter ventrally. Many shortish whiskers. Males are larger.

Distribution and habitat
The species occurs in India, Nepal, Pakistan and Sri Lanka, at altitudes from sea level to 2,670 m asl. It inhabits tropical and sub-tropical forests and grasslands, also making use of irrigated croplands and other cultivated areas.

References

Rats of Asia
Millardia
Rodents of India
Mammals of Nepal
Rodents of Bangladesh
Rodents of Sri Lanka
Mammals described in 1837
Taxonomy articles created by Polbot